Ermanno Carlotto was a river gunboat of the Italian Regia Marina (Royal Navy). After the Italian armistice of 1943 she served in the Imperial Japanese Navy as Narumi, while after the end of World War II she was used by the Navy of the Republic of China and then by the Navy of the People's Republic of China as Qian Kun.

History

Service in the Regia Marina

Construction
In 1910, at the request of the Italian foreign ministry (in turn contacted by the Italian ambassador in Beijing), the Regia Marina decided to build two river gunboats to be stationed in China, to protect the Italian communities along the Chinese rivers and in particular the upper Yangtze and the Hai, where Italian traders and entrepreneurs had built textile factories and managed commercial activities. Larger ships, in fact, could not go beyond Wusong (at the mouth of the Yangtze) and Hankow (and moreover, for economic reasons, the Regia Marina could not afford to maintain warships on station in the Far East: for years the protection of the Italian communities was entrusted to the French). Between March 1911 and November 1913 the gunboat Sebastiano Caboto  was built in Italy, of a 1,000-ton displacement, which reached Shanghai in April 1914 after a four month trip.

It was decided to order the construction at a Chinese shipyard. On the orders of the naval general staff the commander of the armored cruiser  Marco Polo , based in China (according to other sources, the commander of the Beijing detachment), enquired about the local shipyards, and the Shanghai Docks and Engineering Company shipyard was chosen for the construction (according to other sources Dode Engineering). Once the shipyard was chosen (the contract was signed in 1913 ), the new ship was immediately laid down: the construction took place according to the technical and operational specifications mandated by the Regia Marina and was supervised by an officer of the Tientsin detachment of the Regia Marina. The new ship was named after the sottotenente di vascello (sub-lieutenant) Ermanno Carlotto who fell during the Boxer Rebellion and was decorated with the Gold Medal of Military Valour.

The armaments of the gunboat would consist of two  L/40 naval guns (either 1916 or 1917 model, depending on the sources), one forward of the pilothouse and one in the extreme aft part of the deck, and machine guns (six FIAT  and two Colt ). Her propulsion was provided by two Yarrow boilers which originally used coal and were subsequently converted to oil (the oil capacity was 56 tons). The two propellers (capable of reaching 286 rpm) were placed in as many tunnels and thus protected so as not to be damaged by the rocks, while the hull was divided into various compartments. Besides the Italian crew, made up of personnel from the Regia Marina (who, in addition to the ship's armament, were also armed with  Carcano mod. 1891 rifles and 7.65 mm Beretta M1917 pistols), Chinese civilians served on the boat as river pilots, cooks and interpreters.

Laid down in March 1914 the ship should have been completed in December, but construction went slowly, as other constructions were prioritized given the imminent outbreak of a world war. In 1915, following the Italian entry into World War I, the construction of Carlotto was suspended because of Chinese neutrality and was only resumed after the end of the war, with the boat being launched in 1918. The gunboat was commissioned in March 1921(other sources, however, place the entry into service on 12 December 1921) and was immediately sent to the Hai river, where conflicts between two Chinese warlords were endangering foreign citizens. On that occasion  Carlotto  visited some Italian missions which had never been reached by Italian navy ships until then. Later the ship traveled several times on the upper and middle courses of the Yangtze. After returning to Shanghai, the ship went up the Han river, a tributary of the Yangtze River near Hankow, and then the Min river, also a tributary of the Yangtze. During these patrols the gunboat officers for the first time produced detailed nautical charts of these rivers, noting down hydrographic information, flood cycles, currents, shallows and other information needed to navigate the rivers.

Service in the 1920s and 1930s
The voyage was an idea of Da Zara, who had assumed command of the ship in September 1922 and held it until March 1924 after being promoted in 1923 to capitano di corvetta (corvette captain) (he had indeed requested the command of  Carlotto  for this express reason). 

In mid-February 1923 the gunboat went up the Yangtze River to Nanjing and Kiukiang (Jiujiang), to prepare for the ascent, which was to take her beyond Ichang (more than 1,000 miles from the river mouth) and Yibin, on the slopes of Tibet (during a visit on board, a river inspector explained to the crew that beyond Ichang it would only be possible to pay in silver yuans bearing the face of Yuan Shikai). After planning the navigation and embarking the elderly and experienced Chinese pilot Tai Li, Carlotto left Ichang on 11 June 1923. After departing Ichang, more than a 1,000 miles from Shanghai, and meeting the first gorge,  Carlotto  had to face the first rapid (called Taipinkt), in a stretch of river characterized by large and sharp rocks that stretched out towards the center of the bed, producing eddies and countercurrents. After an hour of sailing the gunboat encountered the Kung-Ling rapid, which had previously wrecked other ships, including the German paddle steamer SS Sui Hsiang , which was headed for Chung-King to be the first German vessel to reach it and foundered on the rocks on 28 December 1900. 

Passing at low speed near Shin Men over dangerous rocks (where less than two years earlier the French gunboat Doudart De Lagrée  ran aground, reporting serious damage),  Carlotto  approached the rapid of Yeh-T'an,  in length with the shape of an isosceles triangle (with the base upstream and the vertex opposite towards the valley), which also proved to be very difficult to negotiate for the previous ships that had tried to pass it (the Royal Navy gunboat HMS  Kinsha  had given up after three unsuccessful attempts, while the French  Olry  had only managed to overcome it by being towed from the ground).

The ship, however, continued and on 25 June arrived in Yibin, where the Upper Yangtze began, and she stopped there briefly for some repair work, after which she entered the river Min.

The descent of the river, which is also not without difficulties, made  Carlotto  pass through Nanking, Hankow and finally Shanghai. The Italian gunboat was the first ship to arrive at Chung-King from Shanghai (except to spend the winter there), covering a total of almost  in less than four months. At the end of the voyage, due to the efforts she had been subjected to, the transmission chain that connected the crankshaft to the propeller had lengthened by about 2m. The enterprise had great public resonance, and the Grand Admiral Paolo Thaon di Revel, Minister of the Navy, praised the commander Da Zara, the officers and all crew, especially the engineers. After staying in Shanghai for three months, Da Zara decided to take his leave by organizing a dance ("The Italian Ball") which was well attended by hundreds of Italians residing there.

References

it:Ermanno Carlotto (cannoniera)
fi:RN Ermanno Carlotto
pl:Ermanno Carlotto (1918)
ja:鳴海 (砲艦)

Gunboats of the Regia Marina
Gunboats of the Imperial Japanese Navy
Gunboats of the People's Liberation Army Navy
Ships of the Republic of China Navy
Ships built in China
Shipwrecks in rivers
Shipwrecks of China
1918 ships
Riverine warfare
Captured ships